Francisco Laranjo (1955 – 16 November 2022) was a Portuguese contemporary painter and educator.

Work 
Laranjo was born in 1955 in Lamego, Portugal. He was the director of the School of Arts and associate professor of Porto University and has been lecturer in many universities in cities such as Bilbao, Ottawa, Sheffield, Alexandria, Sofia, Paris and Athens.

As an artist, he has exhibited extensively and in several countries, including Portugal, the Netherlands, Belgium, Germany, Canada, India, United Kingdom, and China.

From his many individual shows, it is possible to highlight the following in Porto (Iter Duriense, Nasoni Gallery, 1993), UK (Simultaneities, Lanchester Gallery, Coventry and The Gallery in Cork Street, London, 1997), Aylmer, Quebec and Toronto, Ontario, Canada (Intimate Land, Chateau Cartier and Camões Institute, 1998), Rio de Janeiro, Brazil (Espelho, Museum of the Republic, 2002), Riga, Latvia (Recent Work, Latvian Academy of Art and Bastejs Gallery, 2002).

Laranjo received several scholarships for post-graduate research, including grants from the Calouste Gulbenkian Foundation (1981–1983), National Scientific Board (Egypt and The Netherlands, 1995), European Committee (1995–1999) and the Goethe Institut, Dresden, Germany.

Laranjo lived and worked in Porto, Portugal. He died from cancer on 16 November 2022, at the age of 67.

Museums and public collections 
 JAP, Modern Art Centre, Calouste Gulbenkian Foundation, Lisbon, Portugal
 Institute of Contemporary Arts, Kunsan National University, Republic of Korea
 Ministry of Culture, Porto, Portugal
 Ministry of Finances Collection, Lisbon, Portugal 
 Amadeo de Souza-Cardoso Museum, Amarante, Portugal
 Serralves Foundation Museum of Contemporary Art, Porto, Portugal
 MARGS, Museu de Arte de Rio Grande do Sul, Porto Alegre, Brazil
 ASP, Museum Wroclaw, Poland
 Macao Cultural Centre, People's Republic of China
 Teixeira Lopes House Museum, Vila Nova de Gaia, Portugal

Other institutions where his work is represented 
 Banco Borges & Irmão
 Banco Comercial de Macau
 Millennium - BCP
 Banco de Fomento Nacional
 Banco de Portugal
 Banco Espírito Santo & Comercial de Lisboa
 Banco Internacional do Funchal
 Banco Português do Atlântico
 Banco Português de Investimento
 Banque Nationale de Paris
 BIC - Banco Internacional de Crédito
 Caixa Geral de Depósitos
 Porto University - School of Arts
 Porto University - School of Humanities
 Cupertino de Miranda Foundation
 Engo António de Almeida Foundation
 Fundação Oriente
 Porto Polytechnic Institute
 Portugal Telecom

References

Sources 
 http://www.portoturismo.pt/index.php?cron=1&m=1&s=4&tipo=4  (Porto City Hall tourism website)
 http://www.axisart.ca/artists/franciscoLaranjo.php

External links 
Francisco Laranjo's website

1955 births
2022 deaths
People from Lamego
20th-century Portuguese painters
Portuguese male painters
University of Porto alumni
20th-century Portuguese male artists
21st-century Portuguese painters